Major General James Malcolm Leslie Renton CB DSO OBE (1898–1972) was a senior British Army officer who briefly commanded the 7th Armoured Division ("The Desert Rats") during the Second World War.

Military career
Renton was commissioned into the Rifle Brigade in 1916 and served in World War I. He was appointed Deputy Assistant Adjutant General for the Iraq Levies in 1922. He also served in World War II as Commander of 2nd Bn the Rifle Brigade from 1940 (leading it and losing an arm at the Battle of Sidi Saleh in 1941) and as Commander of the Support Group of 7th Motor Brigade from 1942 (leading it at the Battle of Gazala). He was appointed General Officer Commanding 7th Armoured Division later that year. He went on to serve at the Senior Officers' School from 1943 before becoming Head of the British Military Mission and Inspector General of the Iraqi Army in 1944 and retiring in 1948.

References

Bibliography

External links
Generals of World War II

|-

1898 births
1972 deaths
British Army major generals
British Army generals of World War II
Rifle Brigade officers
Companions of the Order of the Bath
Companions of the Distinguished Service Order
Officers of the Order of the British Empire
Commandants of the Senior Officers' School, Sheerness
British Army personnel of World War I